Yttre Stengrund was an offshore wind farm in Sweden, operated by Vattenfall. The wind farm was commissioned in 2001, using five 2 MW NEG Micon turbines. 
All turbines in Yttre Stengrund were decommissioned by November 2015, becoming the first offshore wind farm to be decommissioned in the world.

Decommissioning
Maria Hassel, project manager of the dismantling operation for Vattenfall, commented:

References

External links

Wind farms in Sweden
2001 establishments in Sweden
2015 disestablishments in Sweden
Energy infrastructure completed in 2001